is a district located in Kumamoto Prefecture, Japan.

As of the Aso and Yamato mergers (but with 2003 population data), the district has an estimated population of 40,841 and a density of 58.1 persons per square kilometer. The total area is 703.01 km2.

Towns and villages
Minamioguni
Oguni
Takamori
Minamiaso
Nishihara
Ubuyama

Mergers
On February 11, 2005 the old town of Aso absorbed the town of Ichinomiya, and the village of Namino to become the new city of Aso.
On February 11, 2005 the town of Soyō merged with the town of Yabe, and the village of Seiwa, both from Kamimashiki District, to form the new town of Yamato (in Kamimashiki District).
On February 13, 2005 the villages of Chōyō, Hakusui and Kugino merged to form the new village of Minamiaso.

Districts in Kumamoto Prefecture